A list of films produced in South Korea in 1989:

External links
1989 in South Korea

 1980-1989 at www.koreanfilm.org

1989
South Korean
1989 in South Korea